The 1982 Wightman Cup was the 54th edition of the annual women's team tennis competition between the United States and Great Britain. It was held at the Royal Albert Hall in London in England in the United Kingdom.

References

1982
1982 in tennis
1982 in women's tennis
1982 in American tennis
1982 in British sport
1982 sports events in London
1982 in English tennis
1982 in English women's sport